Ronald Vladimir de la Fuente Arias (born January 25, 1991) is a Chilean footballer who plays for Curicó Unido. He plays as a defender.

Career
De la Fuente was born in Talcahuano, where he began his football career with Huachipato. He made a few appearances in the 2011 Clausura and the 2012 Apertura before joining another Primera División club, San Marcos de Arica, on loan. He made only three appearances in the 2013 Transición before making another loan move, to Segunda División (third-tier) club Iberia, under the management of Ronald Fuentes. He started 18 matches as Iberia won the 2013–14 title, before returning to his parent club for whom he made three appearances in the group stages of the Copa Chile. De la Fuente rejoined Iberia for the 2014–15 season, but injury prevented his playing as much as he would have liked.

After Fuentes took over as manager of Primera División club Universidad de Concepción, he signed De la Fuente. He made 11 appearances in the 2015 Apertura and 9 in that season's Copa Chile, helping his team reach the semifinals, as well as appearing on the losing side in the 2015 Supercopa. Although he played little in the Clausura, he established himself in the starting eleven the following season, and his performances attracted attention from other clubs. In early 2018, De la Fuente played in the Copa Libertadores for Universidad de Concepción against Vasco da Gama of Brazil: despite a 4–0 defeat in the first leg, he felt the tie was not over, but, at 2–0 down in the return leg, he was sent off for kicking an opponent in the groin.

Personal life
He began to study law in the context of COVID-19 pandemic, but he had to suspend due to the fact that the university changed the course to in-person mode.

Honours
Huachipato
 Primera División: 2012–C

Deportes Iberia
 Segunda División de Chile: 2013–14

Colo-Colo
 Copa Chile: 2019

References

External links

1991 births
Living people
People from Talcahuano
Chilean footballers
Association football midfielders
Association football defenders
C.D. Huachipato footballers
San Marcos de Arica footballers
Deportes Iberia footballers
Universidad de Concepción footballers
Colo-Colo footballers
Curicó Unido footballers
Chilean Primera División players
Segunda División Profesional de Chile players
Primera B de Chile players